Boutilimit lies 164 km south east of Mauritania's capital of Nouakchott.

The estimated population in 2005 was 27,170.

The town is also well known in the region for its production of handicraft items, particularly rugs made from camel or goat hair, as well as silver crafts.

Notable People 
Notable people from the town include Moktar Ould Daddah, the nation's first president following independence from France, the writers Aïchetou Mint Ahmedou and Moussa Ould Ebnou, the deputy L’Malouma Said, and the journalist Naha Mint Seyyidi.
Mohammad Al-Hasan Al-Dido was born in Boutilimit, he is a Mauritanian Muslim scholar, author, writer, and poet.

References 

 The Boutilimit City
 The Boutilimit Manuscripts
 Saudi Aramco World: Mauritania's Manuscripts

Communes of Trarza Region